The Battle of Othée was fought between the citizens of Liège and a professional army under command of John the Fearless on 23 September 1408. The militia of Liège suffered a heavy defeat.

Cause 
In 1390, John of Bavaria, youngest son of Duke Albert I, Duke of Bavaria only aged 17, had become Prince-Bishop of Liège, with the support of Pope Boniface IX. His rule was a disaster. His authoritarian style clashed with the nobles and burghers of the Prince-Bishopric, who had acquired a certain degree of liberty over the years. He had already been expelled several times, when a new conflict in 1408 made him flee to Maastricht. Henry of Horne, Lord of Perwez was proclaimed Mambour and his son Prince-Bishop. John of Bavaria turned for help to his powerful family.

John's brother was William VI of Hainaut and his brother-in-law John the Fearless of Burgundy. Together with William II, Marquis of Namur, they raised an army and marched against the citizens of Liège.

Henri of Horne was aware that his troops were no match for the professional army heading his way, and therefore proposed to leave the city and start a guerilla war from the countryside. This was refused by the hait-droits, the most radical part of the rebels.

The battle 

The rebels marched towards the enemy and took up position on a little hill in open field between the villages of Othée, Rutten, and Herstappe. Despite the bravery of the rebels, they were surrounded by the reserve troops of the Duke and cut to pieces. On the orders of the Duke, no mercy was given. Henri of Horne, his son, and most of the nobles were amongst the dead.

Aftermath 
John of Bavaria returned from Maastricht and started a brutal repression on the city. The ensuing executions of leading insurgents and their families, including the widow of Henry of Horne, led to John of Bavaria's nickname "the Pitiless." Burgundian influence was extended over the city and over the bishopric of Liège.

References

Sources

External links
 Jean-Louis Kupper, Philippe George, Charles le Téméraire, de la violence et du sacré, éditions du Perron, juin 2007, p. 13.
 La bataille d'Othée 
 Si vera est fama
 Medieval II

Battles of the Wars of Liège
1408 in Europe
Conflicts in 1408
Battles of the Middle Ages
Battles involving Burgundy
Battles in Wallonia
Battle
Battle